Terihi is a small, uninhabited, rocky island in the Marquesas Islands, less than  southeast from Mohotani.

In 1992, the island became officially protected by its inclusion in the Motane Nature Reserve.

See also

 French Polynesia
 Desert island
 List of islands

Islands of the Marquesas Islands
Uninhabited islands of French Polynesia